Dhadhar River is a river in western India in Gujarat whose origin is Pavagadh Hill. Its basin has a maximum length of 142 km.

References

Rivers of Gujarat
Rivers of India